Stacy Christakakis (born 25 March 1964) is an Australian football coach who is the Technical Director of National Premier League side Kingston City FC.

He has worked at South Melbourne Woman's FC in a variety of functions, and had brief spells at Riversdale SC and Monash University.

Managerial career

Early career

Kingston City FC

Richmond SC

References

External links
Linkedin.com
Neoskosmos.com

1964 births
Living people
Sportspeople from Melbourne
Australian soccer coaches